Polutino is a rural locality (a village) in Mardengskoye Rural Settlement, Velikoustyugsky District, Vologda Oblast, Russia. The population was 5 as of 2002.

Geography 
Polutino is located 17 km west of Veliky Ustyug (the district's administrative centre) by road. Bolshoye Yamkino is the nearest rural locality.

References 

Rural localities in Velikoustyugsky District